Sadanandan Rangorath is an Indian film producer and businessman best known in Malayalam cinema. He entered Malayalam cinema producer of Salt N' Pepper directed by Aashiq Abu which got released in 2011 The Movie was the block buster of the year winning the Kerala State Award. for the popular movie of the year.

Personal life
Lucsam Sadanandan rangorath was born in Kollengode, Palakkad Kerala.  He completed his schooling at Muslim Higher Secondary school Pudunagaram, Palakkad and completed his diploma in Mechanical Engineering at Government Polytechnic Palakkad.

Career

He started Vesta Engineering in Mumbai and then diversified into fields including oil and gas drilling and exploration, power generation, hospitality, real estate and as a film producer.

Lucsam Creations is an entertainment/film production and distribution company. It produced 2011 Malayalam movie Salt N' Pepper, which won multiple awards including Kerala State Film Award for the Most Popular Movie of the year (2011). He later produced Nidra, a highly critically acclaimed movie directed by Sidharth Bharatan.

Awards and recognition 

Salt N' Pepper won awards and recognitions under  various categories at the 2011  Asianet, Surya, Vanita, Mathrubhumi, Amritha and Asia Vision Film Awards. It also won the Kerala State Film Award for Best Film with Popular Appeal and Aesthetic Value. He won the iconic producer of the year from International Malayalam film Awards Dubai.

Filmography

As producer

References

External links
 
 Foraying to Tamil
 Lucsam Creations
 Nidra review
 
 
 Lucsam Sadanandan Rangorath

1980 births
Malayali people
People from Palakkad district
Malayalam film producers
Living people
Film producers from Kerala